"Together We're Strong" is a duet written by Ralph Siegel and Richard Palmer-James and performed by French singer Mireille Mathieu and American actor Patrick Duffy. Released in France in 1983 under the Ariola label, the song became a hit in Europe. A 12" extended version was also released in France under the Arabella label. The song was included on Mathieu's album, Je veux l'aimer, as well as her German release, Nur für dich.

The B-side, "Something's Going On", is another Mathieu and Duffy duet written by Ralph Siegel and Phil Coulter. Mathieu and Duffy appeared on many European magazine covers together and made several television appearances singing the song.

Also in 1983, a Finnish version of the song was sung by Mona Carita and Ilkka Salo under the title "Se Ikuista on" ("It's Eternal").

In 1990, Dutch comedians Brigitte Kaandorp and Herman Finkers sung a parody of the song. Their version, titled "We Zijn Samen Sterk," came in the top 10 of the Dutch Top 40.

Chart performance

External links
Together We're Strong at discogs.com

References

1983 singles
Songs written by Ralph Siegel
Songs written by Richard Palmer-James
1983 songs
Ariola Records singles